Earth Dragon may refer to:

Dilong, a Chinese dragon
Earth Dragon (Greyhawk), a deity in the Greyhawk campaign setting for the Dungeons & Dragons fantasy role-playing game